The 1990–91 United Counties League season was the 84th in the history of the United Counties League, a football competition in England.

Premier Division

The Premier Division featured 22 clubs which competed in the division last season, no new clubs joined the division this season.

League table

Division One

Division One featured 18 clubs which competed in the division last season, along with one new club:
Harrowby United, joined from the Midlands Regional Alliance

Also, Irchester Eastfield changed name to Irchester United.

League table

References

External links
 United Counties League

1990–91 in English football leagues
United Counties League seasons